Maaththoor MMDA Park, is an urban park in the neighbourhood of Maaththoor MMDA, Chennai.

History
When CMDA started housing layout in Maaththoor Village in early 1990s, the layout has allocated the land to create a park, but till 2011, the place allocated for park is misused as a dumpyard by Maaththoor Village Panchayat, after the merger of Maaththoor Village Panchayat with Greater Chennai Corporation in October 2011, the place was cleaned to create a park and the construction of the park begin in late 2012. On 21 September 2016 the Chief Minister of Tamil Nadu, J. Jayalalithaa inaugurated the park through video conferencing.

Location
Maaththoor MMDA Park is located in Maaththoor MMDA near the Maaththoor MMDA bus terminal, in the junction of 2nd Main Road and 3rd Cross Street.

The park
The park covers an area of 2.5 acres. The park includes a skating rink, play area, a warm-up arena, 8-shaped walking paths, pebble-filled walking path, a meditation hall, etc. This park is one of the top 10 largest park in Chennai and largest park in North Chennai.

Near By Attractions
 Madhavaram Botanical Garden
 Aavin Goodness Illam
 Maaththoor Lake
 TANUVAS

See also

 Parks in Chennai

References

Geography of Chennai
Tourist attractions in Chennai
Parks in Chennai
Urban public parks